Abu Ali ibn Muhammad (Persian: ابو علی بن محمد) was the king of the Ghurid dynasty. He succeeded his father Muhammad ibn Suri in 1011, after the latter was deposed by Mahmud of Ghazni, who then sent teachers to teach about Islam in Ghor. Abu Ali was one of those who converted to Islam during that period. After his conversion to Islam from Buddhism, he began constructing mosques and madrassas. In ca. 1035, Abu Ali was overthrown by his nephew Abbas ibn Shith.

References

Sources

 

11th-century Iranian people
Ghurid dynasty
1035 deaths
Year of birth missing
Converts to Islam from Buddhism
11th-century rulers in Asia